Juckes is a surname. Notable people with the surname include:

Bing Juckes (1926–1990), Canadian ice hockey player
Gordon Juckes (1914–1994), Canadian ice hockey administrator
Richard Juckes (1902–1981), British cricketer
Robert Juckes Clifton (1826–1869), British politician